Carolyn Thomas (born 1965) is a Welsh Labour Party politician who has been a Member of the Senedd (MS) for North Wales since the 2021 Senedd election.

Early career and election

Before being elected to the Senedd, Thomas worked as a postal worker until 2020 and was a member of the Communication Workers Union (CWU). In 2008, she was elected to Flintshire County Council as an independent representing Treuddyn before joining Labour in 2015. In 2019, Thomas became Deputy Leader of the council.

Whilst Deputy Leader, Thomas delivered a petition to the Senedd, calling for buses to be run 'for people, not profit'. The petition asked the Welsh Government to regulate commercial bus companies and allow local authorities to run their own bus services.

Thomas was selected to lead the North Wales regional list for Labour in the 2021 Senedd election and was elected as Labour's first ever Member of the Senedd for the North Wales region.

Parliamentary career
In February 2022, Thomas was one of three Labour MSs to support introducing rent controls in Wales. Thomas is a supporter of public ownership. In August 2022, she called for energy companies to be nationalised in response to increased bills. 

Since being elected, Thomas has spoken of her experience of working as a postal worker in the Royal Mail following its privatisation in 2013. She has called for Royal Mail to be returned to public ownership, saying that privatisation had 'wrecked' the business because of an 'unhinged profit-obsessed mantra'.

Personal life
Thomas is married and has three children.

References

External links

1965 births
Living people
Welsh Labour members of the Senedd
Female members of the Senedd
21st-century Welsh women politicians
Wales MSs 2021–2026
British postal officials